Sellards Lake is a lake in Meeker County, in the U.S. state of Minnesota.

Sellards Lake was named for Thomas Sellards, an early settler.

See also
List of lakes in Minnesota

References

Lakes of Meeker County, Minnesota
Lakes of Minnesota